Michael "Mike" Morton (born 1971) is an American ultramarathoner and United States Army Special Forces soldier. He currently holds the current US national record for distance run in 24-hour run with 172 miles. He won the IAU 24 Hour World Championship held in Katowice, Poland in 2012 with the distance of 277.543 kilometres. He has set also course records for the Long Haul 100-miler, Umstead 100-miler, The Keys 100-miler and won the Badwater Ultramarathon and Western States among many others.

He was born in Trenton, Michigan.

References

Living people
1971 births
American male ultramarathon runners
American male marathon runners
Sportspeople from Michigan
People from Trenton, Michigan